The Librarian of Congress is the head of the Library of Congress, appointed by the president of the United States with the advice and consent of the United States Senate, for a term of ten years. In addition to overseeing the library, the Librarian of Congress appoints the U.S. poet laureate and awards the Gershwin Prize for Popular Song.

The Librarian of Congress also appoints and oversees the Register of Copyrights of the U.S. Copyright Office and has broad responsibilities around copyright, extending to electronic resources and fair use provisions outlined in the Digital Millennium Copyright Act. The librarian determines whether particular works are subject to DMCA prohibitions regarding technological access protection. On July 13, 2016, the US Senate confirmed Carla Hayden as the librarian by a vote of 74–18 and she was sworn in on September 14, 2016.

Origin and History 
On April 24, 1800, the 6th United States Congress passed an appropriations bill signed by President John Adams which created the Library of Congress. This law was to serve a "further provision for the removal and accommodation of the Government of the United States". The fifth section of the act specifically created the Library of Congress and designated some of its early capabilities. The act provided for "the acquisition of books for congressional use, a suitable place in the Capitol in which to house them, a joint committee to make rules for their selection, acquisition, and circulation", as well as an appropriation of $5,000 for the new library.

In 1802, two years after the creation of the library, President Thomas Jefferson approved a congressional act that created the Office of the Librarian and granted the president power of appointment over the new office. Shortly thereafter, Jefferson appointed his former campaign manager John J. Beckley to serve as the first librarian of Congress. He was paid $2 a day and was also required serve as clerk to the House of Representatives. It was not until 1897 that Congress was given the power to confirm the president's nominee. This same law gave the librarian the sole power for making the institution's rules and appointing the library's staff.

Up until the nomination of Herbert Putnam in 1899 under President McKinley, all previous librarians lacked any prior experience in the profession of librarianship; these librarians had held roles in journalism, law, writing, publishing, and politics. Even to this day, only three librarians – four including acting librarian David S. Mao in 2015 – have worked in the librarian field, despite several instances of opposition from the American Library Association.

Appointment, term length, and salary 
From its creation until 2015, the post of the librarian was not subject to term limits and allowed incumbents to maintain a lifetime appointment once confirmed. Most librarians of Congress have served until death or retirement. There were only 13 librarians of Congress in the more than two centuries from 1802 to 2015, and the library "enjoyed a continuity of atmosphere and of policy that is rare in national institutions". In 2015, Congress passed and President Barack Obama signed into law the "Librarian of Congress Succession Modernization Act of 2015", which put a 10-year term limit on the position with an option for reappointment. The legislation was seen as a critique of Librarian James H. Billington's unwillingness to hire a permanent chief information officer to effectively manage and update the library's information technology.

According to Section 136-1 of Title 2 of the U.S.C., the Librarian of Congress shall be appointed to office by a nomination from the president and the advice and consent of the Senate. The librarian may then serve for a term of 10 years and be reappointed to the post with the same procedure. The Librarian of Congress shall be compensated for his/her services with the equivalent of the rate of pay set by Level II of the Executive Schedule.

Authority and duties 
There are no laws or regulations delineating qualifications for the office holder. The position of Librarian of Congress has been held by candidates of different backgrounds, interests, and talents, throughout its history. Politicians, businessmen, authors, poets, lawyers, and professional librarians have served as the Librarian of Congress. However, at various times there have been proposals for requirements for the position. In 1945, Carl Vitz, then president of the American Library Association, wrote a letter to the President of the United States regarding the position of Librarian of Congress, which had recently become vacant. Vitz felt it necessary to recommend potential librarians. Vitz stated the position "requires a top-flight administrator, a statesman-like leader in the world of knowledge, and an expert in bringing together the materials of scholarship and organizing them for use—in short, a distinguished librarian". In 1989, Congressman Major Owens (D–NY) introduced a bill to set stricter requirements for who may be appointed. He argued appointed librarians need to have specialized training; the bill did not become law.

List of librarians of Congress

Timeline of librarians of Congress

See also
 List of librarians
 Parliamentary Librarian of Canada

References

Further reading
 
 
 
 
 

 
 
Library of Congress
Librarians Of Congress
American librarians
Lists of librarians
1802 establishments in Washington, D.C.